Stovertown is an unincorporated community in Muskingum County, in the U.S. state of Ohio.

History
Stovertown was laid out in 1832 by Samuel Stover, and named for him. A post office called Stovertown operated between 1850 and 1902.

St. John's Evangelical Lutheran Church in Stovertown is listed on the National Register of Historic Places.

References

Unincorporated communities in Muskingum County, Ohio
1832 establishments in Ohio
Populated places established in 1832
Unincorporated communities in Ohio